This is a list of awards and other recognitions earned by South Korean singer BoA.


Awards and nominations

Other accolades

State and cultural honors

Listicles

Notes

References

Awards
BoA